was a public junior college in Abeno-ku, Osaka, Japan.

History 
 1949 The predecessor of the school was founded.
 1998 Junior College was set up at Abeno-ku, Osaka.
 2003 The last student was registered.
 2007 Closed.

Academic departments
 Nursing

See also 
 Osaka City University

Japanese junior colleges
Educational institutions established in 1998
Public universities in Japan
Universities and colleges in Osaka Prefecture
1998 establishments in Japan